The men's football tournament at the 2021 Southeast Asian Games was held from 6 – 22 May 2022 in Vietnam. Ten Southeast Asian nations participated in the men's tournament. The group stage and semi-finals were played in Việt Trì and Nam Định, while Hanoi hosted the bronze and gold medal matches. Men's teams are restricted to under-23 players (born on or after 1 January 1999) with a maximum of three over-aged players allowed.

The tournament was won by Vietnam, who won their second title as a unified nation, having previously won it in 2019, and their third title in total, by beating Thailand 1–0 in the final. Indonesia won the bronze medal after defeating Malaysia on penalties.

Competition schedule
The following is the competition schedule for the men's football competition:

Venues
Three venues were used during the tournament, two of them outside of Hanoi at cities around Vietnam. Mỹ Đình National Stadium hosted the Bronze medal match and the Gold medal Match.

Participating nations

Draw
The draw for the tournament was held on 6 April 2022. 10 teams were seeded into 5 pots based on their performance in the previous two editions. The host, also the defending champion, Vietnam was automatically assigned into position A1. Thailand, as the champion in 2017, was assigned into position B1.

Squads

The men's tournament is an under-23 international tournament, with a maximum of three overage players allowed.

Group stage

Group A

Group B

Knockout stage

Semi-finals

Bronze medal match

Gold medal match

Winners

Goalscorers

Final ranking

See also
 Futsal at the 2021 Southeast Asian Games
 Football at the 2021 Southeast Asian Games - Women's tournament
 Football at the 2021 Southeast Asian Games
 Futsal at the 2021 Southeast Asian Games - Men's tournament
 Futsal at the 2021 Southeast Asian Games - Women's tournament
 2021 Southeast Asian Games

References

Football at the 2021 Southeast Asian Games